The following lists events that happened in 1930 in El Salvador.

Incumbents
President: Pío Romero Bosque
Vice President: Gustavo Vides

Events

Undated

 C.D. Titán, a Salvadoran football club, was established.

References

 
El Salvador
1930s in El Salvador
Years of the 20th century in El Salvador
El Salvador